Aqcheh Kharabeh (also Romanized as Āqcheh Kharābeh and Āqcheh-ye Kharābeh; also known as Āghcheh Kharābeh, Aghcheh Kharabeh, Akhārja Khārāweh, and Āqjeh-ye Kharābeh) is a village in Sardrud-e Olya Rural District, Sardrud District, Razan County, Hamadan Province, Iran. At the 2006 census, its population was 134, in 28 families.

References 

Populated places in Razan County